Dominic Tuohy is an English special effects artist. He won an Academy Award for Best Visual Effects for his work on 1917, and has been nominated for three more for the films Solo: A Star Wars Story and Star Wars: The Rise of Skywalker and The Batman.

 Selected filmography 
 Solo: A Star Wars Story (2018; co-nominated with Rob Bredow, Patrick Tubach and Neal Scanlan)
 Star Wars: The Rise of Skywalker (2019; co-nominated with Roger Guyett, Neal Scanlan and Patrick Tubach)
 1917 (2019; co-won with Guillaume Rocheron and Greg Butler)
 The Batman'' (2022; co-nominated with Dan Lemmon, Russell Earl and Anders Langlands)

References

External links 

Living people
Place of birth missing (living people)
Year of birth missing (living people)
Special effects people
Best Visual Effects Academy Award winners